The Tuzhong-class patrol ship (as designated by NATO) is a is a class of oceangoing rescue and salvage ship in the People's Republic of China's China Coast Guard (CCG). Four were built at the Zhonghua Shipyard, and entered service with the People's Liberation Army Navy in the late-1970s. In 2009, each of the three fleets had one and the fourth was in reserve. In 2012, three were transferred to China Marine Surveillance and from there to the CCG.

The Tuzhongs have a 35-ton capacity towing winch. In PLAN service, T 710 was fitted with a Type 352 radar, possibly for cruise missile tests.

Ships of the class

References

Sources

Patrol vessels of the People's Republic of China
Patrol ship classes